Ger Hegarty (born 1966 in Limerick, Ireland) is an Irish former hurler who played with his local club Old Christians and was a member of the Limerick senior hurling team in the 1980s and 1990s. He played for Limerick in the 1994 All-Ireland final.

He is the father of multiple All-Ireland winning Limerick hurler Gearóid Hegarty.

References

1966 births
Living people
Limerick inter-county hurlers
Munster inter-provincial hurlers
Old Christians hurlers